The 21st Saturn Awards, honoring the best in science fiction, fantasy and horror film and television in 1994, were held on June 26, 1995.

Winners and nominees
Below is a complete list of nominees and winners. Winners are highlighted in boldface.

Film

Television

Video

Special awards
Golden Scroll of Merit (Outstanding Achievement)
 Paul Bunnell – That Little Monster

George Pal Memorial Award
 Robert Zemeckis

Life Career Award
 Joel Silver
 Wes Craven

Lifetime Achievement Award
 Sean Connery

Posthumous Award
 Will Rogers

Special Award
 Richard Fleischer (for his career)

Service Award
 Forrest J Ackerman

References

External links
 Official website

Saturn Awards ceremonies
1995 awards
1995 film awards
1995 television awards
1995 awards in the United States